Bioscopia: Where Science Conquers Evil (aka Biolab) is a 2001 educational adventure video game. It is a sister game to Physicus and Chemicus.

Gameplay 
Gameplay is similar to 1993 video game Myst.

Critical reception 
The game received positive reviews from critics, praising its puzzles, educational content, and graphics.

Awards and nominations 
 2002 Bologna New Media Prize

References 

2001 video games
Educational video games
Video games developed in Germany
Windows games
Windows-only games